The following is a list of crime films released in the 1970s.

Notes

Crime films
1970s